Agba N'Ojie of Uromi, originally called Agba or Agba N'Ojie (Esan God of War), was the King of the Esan people from 1483 AD until 1507 AD.
He was an important Onojie within the history of the Esan people. He was instrumental in the independence of Esanland from the old Benin Empire. He stopped tributes from Enijies in Esanland from being paid to the Oba of Benin, and stopped any appeal cases being taken from Esanland to the Oba's Palace of Benin for retrial during the time of Ozolua n'Ibarmoi 
(or Ozolua the Conqueror).

History 

Agba N'Ojie inherited the Uromi throne after the death of his father Onojie Ijesan, the first Onojie of Uromi. He wanted to free his kin from the control of the old Benin Empire.  The general population of Esan kingdoms initially relocated from Benin City during the rule of Oba Ewuare. These small settlements extended through interior development and recorded movements from Benin around five centuries ago. Such movements into the zone may have occurred before this date. They were driven by ousted sovereigns, bosses, culprits and others who had abandoned Benin City for the uninhabited woodland before 1460 Ewuare's reign as the Oba of Benin. This was done either through the self-centeredness and outrages of a portion of the Obas, or following the cataclysmic common wars over progression.

The recorded relocation out of Benin City occurred amid Oba Ewuare's reign in the fifteenth century when the Oba lost his two children and made some unforgiving laws restricting the subjects from cooking, washing, or having sex for extended periods of time, the Oba needed to use discretion to bring them under Benin's dominion. He welcomed Esan pioneers or their agents to Benin for a détente. He was prepared to perceive and respect his guests with the title of Onojie, which means king. There is no record of any individuals who received the invitation and disregarded it.

They have vanished from history. For the future, Esan laid on the individuals who went to Benin and took the title of Onojie. Agba's father was one of the pioneers initiated by Oba Ewuare in 1463 as the first Onojie of Uromi. At the time when Agba assumed control over the position as the Onojie after the passing of his father, Onojie Ijesan found the way Oba Ewuare used discretion and manipulations to bring the Esan people under the Bini control, choosing to end the Bini control over the Esan people. When Oba Ozolua/Ozolua N'Ibaromi (Ozolua the Conqueror) extended a hand of friendship to Agba Nojie of Uromi, King Agba of Uromi, bluntly and gallantly refused the friendship with the Oba, 
saying it was not an honest friendship and a gesture whose essence was dead on arrival. Indeed, that was a blow to the ego of Oba Ozolua, and war was declared between the two generals, Oba Ozolua of Benin and Onojie Agba Nojie of Uromi, eventually becoming the Bini Esan War.

Bini Esan War
During the 16th century, the Uzea War, which is also known as the Bini Esan War, occurred between the Uromi kingdom and the Kingdom of Benin. The War lasted for many years due to a refusal of friendship from Oba Ozolua of Benin by Onojie Agba N'ojie of Uromi. The people of Esan defined him as a God of War and is worshipped today under a tall kapok tree. A peace treaty was signed between the Esans and the Binis, which the Esans call Ukoven. This was done and sealed by planting the Ohimi tree and pledging the Ohimi oath, "Esan I Gbedo...", which is known today as "Esan Igbe Edo" meaning Esans will no longer attack Binis. Esan kingdoms would loan soldiers to the Benin Kingdom, such as during the Idah War of 1515-1516, and on three occasions when some Obas of Benin were denied their throne, they ran to Esanland and were led by Esan warriors back to Benin to reclaim their throne as Oba. An example of this is Oba Osemwende (1816–1848).

Death

Agba N'Ojie of Uromi's exact date of death was never confirmed because he vanished into Ahojie bush in Uromi and was never seen again.

Worship 

Alu-Agba Deity is a god of war and is worshipped under a tall kapok tree every Uromi first market day by the Esan people. They believe Agba N'Ojie has the power to protect them during the war and hard times.

See also
Ogbidi Okojie

References

1520 deaths
Year of birth unknown
15th-century Nigerian people
16th-century Nigerian people
16th-century monarchs in Africa
History of Nigeria
Esan people